Shawn Matheson (born May 6, 1972) is a former Canadian ice sledge hockey player. He won medals with Team Canada at the 1994 Winter Paralympics, 1998 Winter Paralympics and 2006 Winter Paralympics. He also competed in the 2002 Winter Paralympics and 2010 Winter Paralympics.

Shawn is married to  Miki Matsue Matheson. They met at the 1998 Winter Paralympics  in Nagano, Japan. Together they have two sons and live in the Ottawa Area (Ontario, Canada).

He is the great, great-grandson of John Mercer Johnson, one of Canada's Fathers of Confederation.

References

External links 
 

1972 births
Living people
Canadian sledge hockey players
Paralympic sledge hockey players of Canada
Paralympic gold medalists for Canada
Paralympic silver medalists for Canada
Paralympic bronze medalists for Canada
Ice sledge hockey players at the 1994 Winter Paralympics
Ice sledge hockey players at the 1998 Winter Paralympics
Ice sledge hockey players at the 2002 Winter Paralympics
Ice sledge hockey players at the 2006 Winter Paralympics
Ice sledge hockey players at the 2010 Winter Paralympics
Medalists at the 1994 Winter Paralympics
Medalists at the 1998 Winter Paralympics
Medalists at the 2006 Winter Paralympics
Paralympic medalists in sledge hockey